Nando Tamberlani (1896–1967) was an Italian film actor. A character actor in Italian cinema of the postwar era, he was the brother of actor Carlo Tamberlani. Another brother Ermete Tamberlani was also an actor. He appeared in a number of peplum epics during the late 1950s and 1960s.

Partial filmography

 Felicita Colombo (1937) - Giovannk
 Boccaccio (1940)
 Pia de' Tolomei (1941) - Il vecchio conte della Pietra
 Divieto di sosta (1941)
 The Last Dance (1941) - Il rettore de l'Universita
 A Woman Has Fallen (1941) - Un amico di Nora
 Solitudine (1941) - Mr. Caurel
 C'è un fantasma nel castello (1942)
 La pantera nera (1942) - Il professore Ambrus
 Soltanto un bacio (1942) - Il direttore delle Arti Grafiche
 Malombra (1942) - Don Innocenzo
 Redenzione (1943)
 Farewell Love! (1943) - Il maggiordomo di casa Caracciolo
 Malìa (1946) - Il vescovo
 L'apocalisse (1947)
 Biancaneve e i sette ladri (1949)
 The Thief of Venice (1950) - Lombardi
 Gli uomini non guardano il cielo (1952)
 Buon viaggio pover'uomo (1953) - Padre Priore
 Altair (1956)
 The Sword and the Cross (1956) - Proconsul
 Noi siamo le colonne (1956) - Rettore
 The Mighty Crusaders (1957) - Pietro, eremita
 The Warrior and the Slave Girl (1958) - Senatore Lucilio
 The Sword and the Cross (1958) - Caifa
 The Nights of Lucretia Borgia (1959) - Duca d'Alva
 The Loves of Salammbo (1960) - Gran Sacerdote
 Queen of the Pirates (1960) - The Prior
 The Giants of Thessaly (1960) - Padre di Aglaia
 Il sepolcro dei re (1960)
 The Last of the Vikings (1961) - Gultred
 Hercules and the Conquest of Atlantis (1961) - Tiresia
 The Prisoner of the Iron Mask (1961)
 Drakut il vendicatore (1961)
 Mole Men Against the Son of Hercules (1961) - Khur - King of Aran
 The Centurion (1961) - Callicrates
 The Trojan Horse (1961) - Menelaus
 Gold of Rome (1961) - Mr. De Santis
 Suleiman the Conqueror (1961) - Canciellere di Vienna
 The Corsican Brothers (1961) - Count Franchi
 Kerim, Son of the Sheik (1962) - Mansur
 Vanina Vanini (1961)
 Constantine and the Cross (1961)
 Charge of the Black Lancers (1962) - Il re Stefano III
 Gladiator of Rome (1962) - Valerio's Father
 The Fury of Achilles (1962) - Cressus
 The Rebel Gladiators (1962) - Marcus Aurelius
 Imperial Venus (1962) - Pontefice
 Zorro and the Three Musketeers (1963)
 The Fall of Rome (1963) - Matteo
 Ursus in the Land of Fire (1963) - Lotar
 Hercules of the Desert (1964) - Chancellor Gladius
 Hercules Against the Moon Men (1964) - Manata il saggio
 The Revenge of Ivanhoe (1965) - Prior of Wessex

References

Bibliography
 Roy Kinnard & Tony Crnkovich. Italian Sword and Sandal Films, 1908–1990. McFarland, 2017.

External links

1896 births
1967 deaths
Italian male film actors
People from Apulia